Valerio Fontanals (born 21 August 1948) is a Salvadoran weightlifter. He competed in the men's lightweight event at the 1968 Summer Olympics.

References

1948 births
Living people
Salvadoran male weightlifters
Olympic weightlifters of El Salvador
Weightlifters at the 1968 Summer Olympics
Sportspeople from San Salvador